The following are the final results of the 2002 World Wrestling Championships. The 36th Men's Freestyle Competition was held in Tehran, Iran, while the 47th Men's Greco-Roman Competition was staged  in Moscow, Russia and the 15th Women's Competition in Chalcis, Greece.

Medal table

Team ranking

Medal summary

Men's freestyle

Men's Greco-Roman

Women's freestyle

Participating nations

Men's freestyle
183 competitors from 42 nations participated. The United States freestyle team did not participate due to security concerns.

 (5)
 (5)
 (7)
 (2)
 (6)
 (6)
 (7)
 (7)
 (2)
 (2)
 (2)
 (7)
 (6)
 (1)
 (7)
 (5)
 (7)
 (7)
 (3)
 (7)
 (5)
 (3)
 (3)
 (4)
 (7)
 (1)
 (2)
 (5)
 (3)
 (7)
 (3)
 (2)
 (6)
 (1)
 (4)
 (1)
 (1)
 (7)
 (3)
 (7)
 (6)
 (1)

Men's Greco-Roman
215 competitors from 51 nations participated.

 (6)
 (1)
 (1)
 (3)
 (7)
 (1)
 (7)
 (7)
 (3)
 (1)
 (7)
 (3)
 (3)
 (3)
 (4)
 (6)
 (6)
 (6)
 (7)
 (7)
 (7)
 (4)
 (4)
 (2)
 (6)
 (6)
 (5)
 (1)
 (5)
 (1)
 (2)
 (1)
 (4)
 (2)
 (7)
 (1)
 (5)
 (7)
 (2)
 (6)
 (3)
 (6)
 (2)
 (1)
 (7)
 (2)
 (7)
 (7)
 (7)
 (3)
 (3)

Women's freestyle
150 competitors from 34 nations participated.

 (5)
 (2)
 (3)
 (7)
 (7)
 (6)
 (1)
 (6)
 (7)
 (7)
 (1)
 (5)
 (5)
 (7)
 (3)
 (1)
 (1)
 (4)
 (6)
 (3)
 (2)
 (6)
 (2)
 (3)
 (7)
 (3)
 (5)
 (4)
 (4)
 (3)
 (4)
 (7)
 (7)
 (6)

References

Women official website
Greco-Roman official website
Freestyle official website
UWW Database

 
World Wrestling Championships
W
W
W
W
W
W
Sport in Tehran
International wrestling competitions hosted by Russia